Live from Mountain Stage is a live album by John Hartford, released in 2000.

Track listing
All songs by John Hartford unless otherwise noted.
"I Wish We Had Our Time Again" – 2:47
"Lorena" (Joseph Philbrick Webster, Henry DeLafayette Webster) – 3:56
"More Big Bull Fiddle Fun" – 3:26
"Fiddle Tune" – 2:01
"Bring Your Clothes Back Home and Try Me One More Time" – 2:46
"Gum Tree Canoe" (S. S. Steele) – 2:59
"Gentle on My Mind" – 3:07
"Yellow Barber" (Buddy Thomas) – 1:40
"My Tears Don't Show" (Carl Butler) – 3:11
"I Wonder Where You Are Tonight" (Johnny Bond) – 3:29
"Where Does an Old Time River Man Go" – 4:21
"Catletsburg" (Ed Haley) – 2:08
"The Annual Waltz" – 4:44

Personnel
John Hartford - vocals, fiddle, banjo
Steve Hill - bass
Julie Adams - vocals
Mike Compton - mandolin
Michael Lipton - guitar
Ron Sowell - guitar, harmonica
Bob Thompson - keyboards
Ammed Solomon - drums, percussion

Production
Larry Groce - producer
Scott Robinson - engineer
Richie Collins - mixing
Erik Wolf - digital mastering, digital engineer
Angela Haglund - design
Brian Blauser - photography
Senor McGuire - photography

References

John Hartford albums
2000 live albums